Kim Pensyl is an American pop-jazz and new-age music keyboardist. He attended Ohio State University, and the University of California, Northridge for graduate school and had several CDs produced by Shanachie Records. He has worked in bands with Al Hirt, Don Ellis, Hubert Laws, Gerald Wilson, and Guy Lombardo.  He is part of the Jazz Studies Department faculty at the College-Conservatory of Music (part of the University of Cincinnati).

Career
Kim Pensyl is a musician, composer, and arranger who has twice been named one of Billboard’s Top-20 Contemporary Jazz Artists of the Year. A pianist and trumpeter, he has had four Top-10 albums on Billboard’s Contemporary Jazz chart. He has recorded with jazz artists such as Toots Thielemans, and modern musicians like Joey Calderazzo, Bob Mintzer, Chiele Minucci, Andy Narell, Will Kennedy, Steve Rodby, and Alex Acuna. He has performed at jazz venues such as The Blue Note, Blues Alley, Caravan of Dreams, Scullers, Beacon Theatre, and Great American Music Hall. He has also appeared at the Clearwater Jazz Festival, Sunfest, Summerfest, Stone Mountain Jazz Festival, and Pacific Jazz Festival among others. Also, Kim has toured with the Woody Herman Orchestra and Acoustic Alchemy. He has more than 100 published works recorded and over 150 compositions and arrangements in his catalog. Kim is currently teaching jazz studies at the College-Conservatory of Music at the University of Cincinnati. He is the featured artist in the WJZA Smooth Jazz Trio around Central Ohio and also performs at various clubs and concerts. In addition, he performs with the faculty and guest artists at CCM, such as Arturo Sandoval, Terri Lyne Carrington, and Mulgrew Miller among others, along with several big bands in the Cincinnati area.

Discography
 1988  Pensyl Sketches #1
 1989  Pensyl Sketches #2
 1989  A Kim Pensyl Christmas
 1990  Pensyl Sketches #3
 1992  3 Day Weekend
 1993  Eyes of Wonder
 1994  When You Were Mine
 1996  Under the Influence
 1997  Quiet Cafe
 1999  Places I've Been
 2002  At the Moment
 2004  Solo Sketches October
 2008  When Katie Smiles
 2010  On the Horizon
 2012  Foursight
 2015  Foreign Love Affair
 2015  Early Snowfall

References

External links
[ All Music]
 Myspace page
 Kim Pensyl Homepage

Living people
Year of birth missing (living people)
21st-century American male musicians
21st-century American pianists
American jazz pianists
American male jazz musicians
American male pianists
California State University, Northridge alumni
New-age musicians
Ohio State University alumni
Optimism Records artists
University of Cincinnati faculty